Bump in the Night may refer to:

Bump in the Night (TV series), a 1994 U.S. animated TV series
Bump in the Night (album), a 1981 album by Ian McLagan
Bump in the Night (novel), a 1960 novel by Colin Watson in the Flaxborough series of crime novels
Bump in the Night (novel), a 1988 novel by Isabelle Holland
Bump in the Night (film), a 1991 film based on the novel

See also
 Things That Go Bump in the Night (disambiguation)